Qeshlaq-e Sarudlu Kandi (also Romanized as Qeshlāq-e Sarūdlū Kandī) is a village in Mahmudabad Rural District, Tazeh Kand District, Parsabad County, Ardabil Province, Iran. At the 2006 census, its population was 395, in 93 families.

References 

Towns and villages in Parsabad County